The Inner North Coast Ranges occur along the east slope of the outer Northern California Coast Ranges. The term inner is a reference to the greater distances of the mountain ranges from the Pacific Ocean, compared to the outer ranges that are nearer to that ocean, and often larger.

Geography
The inner ranges of mountains and hills run from near Anderson, California at south end of the High North Coast Ranges, southwards to west of the Russian River.

Ecology
Willis Linn Jepson was one of the first to describe the flora of the Inner North Coast Ranges. Jepson noted the presence of Yellow Pine (Pinus ponderosa ) and Sugar Pine (Pinus lambertiana ) species.

See also
Inner Coast Ranges
California Coast Ranges
Pinus classification
Index: Natural history of the California Coast Ranges

References
 Willis Linn Jepson. 1909. The trees of California, 228 pages, Published by Cunningham, Curtis & Welch

Line notes

External links

California Coast Ranges
Landforms of Tehama County, California
Mountain ranges of Glenn County, California
Mountain ranges of Butte County, California
Mountain ranges of Northern California